Gymnopilus hybridus is a species of agaric fungus in the family Hymenogastraceae.

See also

List of Gymnopilus species

References

External links

Fungi described in 1789
Fungi of Europe
Fungi of North America
hybridus
Taxa named by Jean Baptiste François Pierre Bulliard